Amar Nath Sehgal (5 February, 1922 – 28 December, 2007) was a noted Indian modernist sculptor, painter, poet and art educator. He started his career as an engineer in Lahore, and later turned to art. He shifted to Delhi after partition of India in 1947, and in 1950 studied art education from New York University School of Education. Subsequently, became an art educator, teaching at College of Art, Delhi, and in time a noted modern sculptor to his generation. Though he also ventured into painting, drawings and poetry.

In 1979, Amar Nath Sehgal set up his studio in the Grand Duchy of Luxembourg and lived between Luxembourg and India until his return to New Delhi in 2004. His long romance with Luxembourg goes back to 1966 when he had his first solo exhibition at the Musée National d'Histoire et d'Arts in Luxembourg-City. His iconic bronze bust sculpture of Mahatma Gandhi in the Municipal Park in Luxembourg celebrates the strong connection he had with Luxembourg. The bronze bust, a gift by the philanthropist Henry J. Leir was inaugurated on 21 June 1973 in the presence of the Minister of Foreign Affaires Gaston Thorn and the Ambassador of India to Luxembourg K. B. Lall. In February 1980, the original bust was stolen and in 1982 Amar Nath Sehgal gifted a copy of the original which was inaugurated on 2 October 1982, on the 113th Anniversary of the Birth of Mahatma Gandhi.

Later in life, he also became a pioneer of intellectual property rights, especially moral rights in copyright for artists in India, after he fought a 13-year-long legal case with Government of India. A bronze mural which he created for the Vigyan Bhavan, Delhi in the 1960s, was removed without his consent, during renovations in 1979. He filed the case at Delhi High Court in 1992, and the courts finally awarded him damages in 2005.

In 1986, he founded "The Creative Fund" in Luxembourg to help young artists from Luxembourg and India discover and be inspired by the rich history, the culture and the heritage of both countries.

1993, he was awarded the Lalit Kala Akademi Fellowship by the Lalit Kala Akademi, India's National Academy of Art, the highest honour in the fine arts conferred by the Government of India. In 2008, he was posthumously awarded the Padma Bhushan, by Government of India.

Early life and background
Born on 5 February 1922, Sehgal was originally from Campbellpur (Attock), in North Punjab (now in Pakistan). He shifted to Lahore in 1939 to study at Government College, Lahore where he graduated in 1941. Thereafter he studied industrial chemistry at Banaras Hindu University till 1942. Subsequently, he started worked as an engineer in Lahore, while studying arts privately.

During the riots that preceded the partition of India in 1947, he left Lahore in May 1947, and travelled to Eastern Punjab and Kangra-Kullu Valley, where he witnessed macabre killings of local Muslim minority. This was to have a lasting impact both of his psyche and his art. Finally he settled in Delhi, where he reestablished himself. He travelled on a freight for 47 days to New York. He later obtained a master's degree in art education from New York University School of Education (now rename Steinhardt School of Culture, Education, and Human Development) in 1950. During this period he was exposed to world art and inspirations of Henri Matisse.

Career
His first exhibition was inaugurated in New York in 1951, by India's permanent representative to the United Nations. Upon his return from US, Sehgal taught at the Modern School, New Delhi for a short while, and his wife Sheila Dhawan was also a teacher at its Junior School. Later he remained a faculty at College of Art, Delhi, University of Delhi and established his studio in Delhi. In time, he became a leading exponents of modernism in Indian sculptor. Themes of much of his oeuvre revolved around the importance of individual freedom and human dignity, and his response the horrors of political violence.

His works were exhibited in many places across the world, winning him international acclaim. Many of his sculptures in stone and metal are in the collection of National Gallery of Modern Art, New Delhi.

In 1957, he was commission to create mural for the Vigyan Bhavan, India's first state convention centre. The bronze mural spanned 140 feet by 40 feet, depicting rural and modern India, and was completed five years later and installed in the foyer of the building in 1962. Subsequently, in 1979, during renovations, the mural was removed without his consent, and shifted to the storehouse. When in the following years despite his request no action was taken, He filed a case at the Delhi High Court seeking damages. Thus Amar Nath Sehgal v. Union of India. After a 13-year-long legal proceeding, the case was finally decided in his favour on 21 February 2005. Thus it became a landmark case in Indian legal history, as for the first time uphold the moral right of an author under the Indian Copyright Act and awarded damages. The government was also asked to return his mural

Besides art, Sehgal was also a poet, he published two collection of his poems, Lonesome Journey (1996) and Awaiting a New Dawn (1998).

A bronze sculpture titled, The Captive, first designed by Sehgal for the U.N. conference on sanctions against South Africa, held at Paris in 1986 was later installed on Robben Island, Cape Town, Nelson Mandela's former island prison, on National Women's Day, 9 August 2011. In the following year, a large stone sculpture by him, "Aiming For Excellence" was installed at the DDA Yamuna Sports Complex in New Delhi. In October 2004, an exhibition of his paintings on Ramayana and Mahabharata, as "tribute to Rishi Valmiki and Rishi Vyasa" was inaugurated by then President A P J Abdul Kalam at the Indira Gandhi National Centre for the Arts .

The Lalit Kala Akademi, India's National Academy of Art, in 1993, awarded him the 1993, awarded the Lalit Kala Akademi Fellowship, the highest honour in the fine arts conferred by the Government of India. He had a close to the first Prime Minister Jawaharlal Nehru and subsequently the Nehru–Gandhi family.

He died on 28 December 2007 in New Delhi, at age 85, after a brief illness. In the following year, he was posthumously awarded the Padma Bhushan, by Government of India.

Monographs and other works

References

Bibliography

External links

 Documentary by Doordarshan on YouTube (in English and Hindi)
 

1922 births
2007 deaths
Indian male sculptors
Modern sculptors
Indian male painters
Indian art educators
English-language poets from India
Banaras Hindu University alumni
Steinhardt School of Culture, Education, and Human Development alumni
Academic staff of Delhi University
People from Delhi
Copyright activists
Indian human rights activists
Recipients of the Padma Bhushan in arts
Fellows of the Lalit Kala Akademi
20th-century Indian sculptors
20th-century Indian painters
20th-century Indian poets
Indian male poets
Indian expatriates in the United States
Indian intellectual property law